Ahmed Boutagga (born 18 December 1997) is an Algerian footballer who plays for NA Hussein Dey in the Algerian Ligue Professionnelle 1.

Career 
In 2019, he signed a contract with MC Alger.

References 

1997 births
Living people
Algerian footballers
Association football goalkeepers
MC Alger players
People from Koléa
21st-century Algerian people